Hangin' On is an album by American country music artist Waylon Jennings, released in 1968 on RCA Victor.

Background
Hangin' On is most notable for the hit single "The Chokin' Kind," which rose to #9 on the country charts, Jennings' best showing up to that time.  It was written by Harlan Howard, whose songs Waylon covered extensively in the 1960s.  In the authorized video biography Renegade Outlaw Legend, Waylon recalls, "I remember the first time I'd heard that, it was a demo that he had done, just himself, and I flipped over that song.  I loved that song."  In the same documentary Howard added, "My melody was pretty straight, and with this beautiful voice of his he changed the melody.  I liked that melody better."

Hangin' On climbed to #9 on the Billboard country albums chart.  Praising "I Fall in Love So Easy" as the LP's "premier track," Eugene Chadbourne of AllMusic opines, "Sticking to totally musical criteria, the best tracks on this collection are so good that dismissing the gunky ones is easy...Jennings' backup, the Waylors, actually plays on a few tracks here, a hard-fought compromise with RCA producer Chet Atkins, who wanted his own session crew to provide backup. There are no further musical credits, and no information about who thought up the wonderful parts of this album. Call it a brilliant collaboration of Jennings and Atkins at the dawn of a new era in country ."

Track listing

Waylon Jennings albums
1968 albums
RCA Victor albums
Albums produced by Chet Atkins